In mathematics, and especially differential geometry and mathematical physics, gauge theory is the general study of connections on vector bundles, principal bundles, and fibre bundles. Gauge theory in mathematics should not be confused with the closely related concept of a gauge theory in physics, which is a field theory which admits gauge symmetry. In mathematics theory means a mathematical theory, encapsulating the general study of a collection of concepts or phenomena, whereas in the physical sense a gauge theory is a mathematical model of some natural phenomenon.

Gauge theory in mathematics is typically concerned with the study of gauge-theoretic equations. These are differential equations involving connections on vector bundles or principal bundles, or involving sections of vector bundles, and so there are strong links between gauge theory and geometric analysis. These equations are often physically meaningful, corresponding to important concepts in quantum field theory or string theory, but also have important mathematical significance. For example, the Yang–Mills equations are a system of partial differential equations for a connection on a principal bundle, and in physics solutions to these equations correspond to vacuum solutions to the equations of motion for a classical field theory, particles known as instantons.

Gauge theory has found uses in constructing new invariants of smooth manifolds, the construction of exotic geometric structures such as hyperkähler manifolds, as well as giving alternative descriptions of important structures in algebraic geometry such as moduli spaces of vector bundles and coherent sheaves.

History

Gauge theory has its origins as far back as the formulation of Maxwell's equations describing classical electromagnetism, which may be phrased as a gauge theory with structure group the circle group. Work of Paul Dirac on magnetic monopoles and relativistic quantum mechanics encouraged the idea that bundles and connections were the correct way of phrasing many problems in quantum mechanics. Gauge theory in mathematical physics arose as a significant field of study with the seminal work of Robert Mills and Chen-Ning Yang on so-called Yang–Mills gauge theory, which is now the fundamental model that underpins the standard model of particle physics.

The mathematical investigation of gauge theory has its origins in the work of Michael Atiyah, Isadore Singer, and Nigel Hitchin on the self-duality equations on a Riemannian manifold in four dimensions. In this work the moduli space of self-dual connections (instantons) on Euclidean space was studied, and shown to be of dimension  where  is a positive integer parameter. Such instantons are defined by a choice of 5 parameters, the center  and scale , corresponding to the -dimensional moduli space. A BPST instanton is depicted to the right.

Around the same time Atiyah and Richard Ward discovered links between solutions to the self-duality equations and algebraic bundles over the complex projective space . Another significant early discovery was the development of the ADHM construction by Atiyah, Vladimir Drinfeld, Hitchin, and Yuri Manin. This construction allowed for the solution to the anti-self-duality equations on Euclidean space  from purely linear algebraic data.

Significant breakthroughs encouraging the development of mathematical gauge theory occurred in the early 1980s. At this time the important work of Atiyah and Raoul Bott about the Yang–Mills equations over Riemann surfaces showed that gauge theoretic problems could give rise to interesting geometric structures, spurring the development of infinite-dimensional moment maps, equivariant Morse theory, and relations between gauge theory and algebraic geometry. Important analytical tools in geometric analysis were developed at this time by Karen Uhlenbeck, who studied the analytical properties of connections and curvature proving important compactness results. The most significant advancements in the field occurred due to the work of Simon Donaldson and Edward Witten.

Donaldson used a combination of algebraic geometry and geometric analysis techniques to construct new invariants of four manifolds, now known as Donaldson invariants. With these invariants, novel results such as the existence of topological manifolds admitting no smooth structures, or the existence of many distinct smooth structures on the Euclidean space  could be proved. For this work Donaldson was awarded the Fields Medal in 1986.

Witten similarly observed the power of gauge theory to describe topological invariants, by relating quantities arising from Chern–Simons theory in three dimensions to the Jones polynomial, an invariant of knots. This work and the discovery of Donaldson invariants, as well as novel work of Andreas Floer on Floer homology, inspired the study of topological quantum field theory.

After the discovery of the power of gauge theory to define invariants of manifolds, the field of mathematical gauge theory expanded in popularity. Further invariants were discovered, such as Seiberg–Witten invariants and Vafa–Witten invariants. Strong links to algebraic geometry were realised by the work of Donaldson, Uhlenbeck, and Shing-Tung Yau on the Kobayashi–Hitchin correspondence relating Yang–Mills connections to stable vector bundles. Work of Nigel Hitchin and Carlos Simpson on Higgs bundles demonstrated that moduli spaces arising out of gauge theory could have exotic geometric structures such as that of hyperkähler manifolds, as well as links to integrable systems through the Hitchin system. Links to string theory and mirror symmetry were realised, where gauge theory is essential to phrasing the homological mirror symmetry conjecture and the AdS/CFT correspondence.

Fundamental objects of interest

The fundamental objects of interest in gauge theory are connections on vector bundles and principal bundles. In this section we briefly recall these constructions, and refer to the main articles on them for details. The structures described here are standard within the differential geometry literature, and an introduction to the topic from a gauge-theoretic perspective can be found in the book of Donaldson and Peter Kronheimer.

Principal bundles

The central objects of study in gauge theory are principal bundles and vector bundles. The choice of which to study is essentially arbitrary, as one may pass between them, but principal bundles are the natural objects from the physical perspective to describe gauge fields, and mathematically they more elegantly encode the corresponding theory of connections and curvature for vector bundles associated to them.

Here  is the total space, and  the base space.

The simplest examples of principal bundles are given when  is the circle group. In this case the principal bundle has dimension  where .

Since a principal bundle is a fibre bundle, it locally has the structure of a product.

on any triple overlap . In order to define a principal bundle it is enough to specify such a choice of transition functions, The bundle is then defined by gluing trivial bundles  along the intersections  using the transition functions. The cocycle condition ensures precisely that this defines an equivalence relation on the disjoint union  and therefore that the quotient space  is well-defined. This is known as the fibre bundle construction theorem and the same process works for any fibre bundle described by transition functions, not just principal bundles or vector bundles.

Notice that a choice of local section  satisfying  is an equivalent method of specifying a local trivialisation map. Namely, one can define  where  is the unique group element such that .

Vector bundles

A vector bundle is a triple  where  is a fibre bundle with fibre given by a vector space  where  is a field. The number  is the rank of the vector bundle. Again one has a local description of a vector bundle in terms of a trivialising open cover. If  is such a cover, then under the isomorphism

These are defined by the equation

To specify a trivialisation it is therefore equivalent to give a collection of  local sections which are everywhere linearly independent, and use this expression to define the corresponding isomorphism. Such a collection of local sections is called a frame.

Similarly to principal bundles, one obtains transition functions  for a vector bundle, defined by

Associated bundles

In terms of transition functions the associated bundle can be understood more simply. If the principal bundle  has transition functions  with respect to a local trivialisation , then one constructs the associated vector bundle using the transition functions .

The associated bundle construction can be performed for any fibre space , not just a vector space, provided  is a group homomorphism. One key example is the capital A adjoint bundle  with fibre , constructed using the group homomorphism  defined by conjugation . Note that despite having fibre , the Adjoint bundle is neither a principal bundle, or isomorphic as a fibre bundle to  itself. For example, if  is Abelian, then the conjugation action is trivial and  will be the trivial -fibre bundle over  regardless of whether or not  is trivial as a fibre bundle.

Gauge transformations

A gauge transformation of a vector bundle or principal bundle is an automorphism of this object. For a principal bundle, a gauge transformation consists of a diffeomorphism  commuting with the projection operator  and the right action . For a vector bundle a gauge transformation is similarly defined by a diffeomorphism  commuting with the projection operator  which is a linear isomorphism of vector spaces on each fibre.

One can also define a local gauge transformation as a local bundle isomorphism over a trivialising open subset . This can be uniquely specified as a map  (taking  in the case of vector bundles), where the induced bundle isomorphism is defined by

and similarly for vector bundles.

Notice that given two local trivialisations of a principal bundle over the same open subset , the transition function is precisely a local gauge transformation . That is, local gauge transformations are changes of local trivialisation for principal bundles or vector bundles.

Connections on principal bundles

A connection on a principal bundle is a method of connecting nearby fibres so as to capture the notion of a section  being constant or horizontal. Since the fibres of an abstract principal bundle are not naturally identified with each other, or indeed with the fibre space  itself, there is no canonical way of specifying which sections are constant. A choice of local trivialisation leads to one possible choice, where if  is trivial over a set , then a local section could be said to be horizontal if it is constant with respect to this trivialisation, in the sense that  for all  and one . In particular a trivial principal bundle  comes equipped with a trivial connection.

Given a vector field , there is a unique horizontal lift . The curvature of the connection  is given by the two-form with values in the adjoint bundle  defined by 

where  is the Lie bracket of vector fields. From the perspective of the Frobenius integrability theorem, the curvature measures precisely the extent to which the horizontal distribution fails to be integrable, and therefore the extent to which  fails to embed inside  as a horizontal submanifold locally.

The choice of horizontal subspaces may be equivalently expressed by a projection operator  which is equivariant in the correct sense, called the connection one-form. For a horizontal distribution , this is defined by  where  denotes the decomposition of a tangent vector with respect to the direct sum decomposition .

Cartan's structure equation says that the curvature may be expressed in terms of the local one-form  by the expression

Under a local gauge transformation  so that , the local connection one-form transforms by the expression

where  denotes the Maurer–Cartan form of the Lie group . In the case where  is a matrix Lie group, one has the simpler expression

Connections on vector bundles

A connection on a vector bundle may be specified similarly to the case for principal bundles above, known as an Ehresmann connection. However vector bundle connections admit a more powerful description in terms of a differential operator. A connection on a vector bundle is a choice of -linear differential operator

such that

for all  and sections . The covariant derivative of a section  in the direction of a vector field  is defined by

In a local trivialisation the exterior derivative  acts as a trivial connection (corresponding in the principal bundle picture to the trivial connection discussed above). Namely for a local frame  one defines

where here we have used Einstein notation for a local section .

Any two connections  differ by an -valued one-form . To see this, observe that the difference of two connections is -linear:

In particular since every vector bundle admits a connection (using partitions of unity and the local trivial connections), the set of connections on a vector bundle has the structure of an infinite-dimensional affine space modelled on the vector space . This space is commonly denoted .

In terms of this local connection form, the curvature may be written as

where the wedge product occurs on the one-form component, and one composes endomorphisms on the endomorphism component. To link back to the theory of principal bundles, notice that  where on the right we now perform wedge of one-forms and commutator of endomorphisms.

Under a gauge transformation  of the vector bundle , a connection  transforms into a connection  by the conjugation . Under a local gauge transformation  one obtains the same expression

as in the case of principal bundles.

Induced connections

A connection on a principal bundle induces connections on associated vector bundles. One way to see this is in terms of the local connection forms described above.

The induced curvature can be simply defined by

Here one sees how the local expressions for curvature are related for principal bundles and vector bundles, as the Lie bracket on the Lie algebra  is sent to the commutator of endomorphisms of  under the Lie algebra homomorphism .

Space of connections

The central object of study in mathematical gauge theory is the space of connections on a vector bundle or principal bundle. Two connections  are said to be gauge equivalent if there exists a gauge transformation  such that . Gauge theory is concerned with gauge equivalence classes of connections. In some sense gauge theory is therefore concerned with the properties of the quotient space , which is in general neither a Hausdorff space or a smooth manifold.

The most famous application of this idea is Donaldson's theorem, which uses the moduli space of Yang–Mills connections on a principal -bundle over a simply connected four-manifold  to study its intersection form. For this work Donaldson was awarded a Fields Medal.

Notational conventions
There are various notational conventions used for connections on vector bundles and principal bundles which will be summarised here.
 The letter  is the most common symbol used to represent a connection on a vector bundle or principal bundle. It comes from the fact that if one chooses a fixed connection  of all connections, then any other connection may be written  for some unique one-form . Sometimes the symbol  is also used to refer to the connection form, usually on a principal bundle, and usually in this case  refers to the global connection one-form  on the total space of the principal bundle, rather than the corresponding local connections forms.
 The symbol  is most commonly used to represent a connection on a vector bundle as a differential operator, and in that sense is used interchangeably with the letter . It is also used to refer to the covariant derivative operators .
 The operator  most commonly refers to the exterior covariant derivative of a connection  (and so is sometimes written  for a connection ).
 The letter  is often used to denote a principal bundle connection or Ehresmann connection when emphasis is to be placed on the horizontal distribution . Using this convention the curvature is sometimes denoted  to emphasize the dependence, and  may refer to either the curvature operator on the total space , or the curvature on the base .

Dictionary of mathematical and physical terminology

The mathematical and physical fields of gauge theory involve the study of the same objects, but use different terminology to describe them. Below is a summary of how these terms relate to each other.

As a demonstration of this dictionary, consider an interacting term of an electron-positron particle field and the electromagnetic field in the Lagrangian of quantum electrodynamics:

Mathematically this might be rewritten

The first term is an interacting term in the Lagrangian between the spinor field (the field representing the electron-positron) and the gauge field (representing the electromagnetic field). The second term is the regular Yang–Mills functional which describes the basic non-interacting properties of the electromagnetic field (the connection ). The term of the form  is an example of what in physics is called minimal coupling, that is, the simplest possible interaction between a matter field  and a gauge field .

Yang–Mills theory

The predominant theory that occurs in mathematical gauge theory is Yang–Mills theory. This theory involves the study of connections which are critical points of the Yang–Mills functional defined by

where  is an oriented Riemannian manifold with  the Riemannian volume form and  an -norm on the adjoint bundle . This functional is the square of the -norm of the curvature of the connection , so connections which are critical points of this function are those with curvature as small as possible (or higher local minima of ).

These critical points are characterised as solutions of the associated Euler–Lagrange equations, the Yang–Mills equations

Such solutions are called Yang–Mills connections and are of significant geometric interest.

The Bianchi identity asserts that for any connection, . By analogy for differential forms a harmonic form  is characterised by the condition

If one defined a harmonic connection by the condition that

the then study of Yang–Mills connections is similar in nature to that of harmonic forms. Hodge theory provides a unique harmonic representative of every de Rham cohomology class . Replacing a cohomology class by a gauge orbit , the study of Yang–Mills connections can be seen as trying to find unique representatives for each orbit in the quotient space  of connections modulo gauge transformations.

Self-duality and anti-self-duality equations

In dimension four the Hodge star operator sends two-forms to two-forms, and squares to the identity operator, . Thus the Hodge star operating on two-forms has eigenvalues , and the two-forms on an oriented Riemannian four-manifold split as a direct sum

That is,  is self-dual if , and anti-self dual if , and every differential two-form admits a splitting  into self-dual and anti-self-dual parts.

If the curvature of a connection  on a principal bundle over a four-manifold is self-dual or anti-self-dual then by the Bianchi identity , so the connection is automatically a Yang–Mills connection. The equation

is a first order partial differential equation for the connection , and therefore is simpler to study than the full second order Yang–Mills equation. The equation  is called the self-duality equation, and the equation  is called the anti-self-duality equation, and solutions to these equations are self-dual connections or anti-self-dual connections respectively.

Dimensional reduction

One way to derive new and interesting gauge-theoretic equations is to apply the process of dimensional reduction to the Yang–Mills equations. This process involves taking the Yang–Mills equations over a manifold  (usually taken to be the Euclidean space ), and imposing that the solutions of the equations be invariant under a group of translational or other symmetries.

Gauge theory in one and two dimensions

Here the Yang–Mills equations when the base manifold  is of low dimension is discussed.

Yang–Mills theory

One may study the Yang–Mills equations directly on a manifold of dimension two. The theory of Yang–Mills equations when the base manifold is a compact Riemann surface was carried about by Michael Atiyah and Raoul Bott. In this case the moduli space of Yang–Mills connections over a complex vector bundle  admits various rich interpretations, and the theory serves as the simplest case to understand the equations in higher dimensions. The Yang–Mills equations in this case become

Such connections are called projectively flat, and in the case where the vector bundle is topologically trivial (so ) they are precisely the flat connections.

When the rank and degree of the vector bundle are coprime, the moduli space  of Yang–Mills connections is smooth and has a natural structure of a symplectic manifold. Atiyah and Bott observed that since the Yang–Mills connections are projectively flat, their holonomy gives projective unitary representations of the fundamental group of the surface, so that this space has an equivalent description as a moduli space of projective unitary representations of the fundamental group of the Riemann surface, a character variety. Through this isomorphism the moduli space of Yang–Mills connections gains a complex structure, which interacts with the symplectic structure of Atiyah and Bott to make it a compact Kähler manifold.

Simon Donaldson gave an alternative proof of the theorem of Narasimhan and Seshadri that directly passed from Yang–Mills connections to stable holomorphic structures. Atiyah and Bott used this rephrasing of the problem to illuminate the intimate relationship between the extremal Yang–Mills connections and the stability of the vector bundles, as an infinite-dimensional moment map for the action of the gauge group , given by the curvature map  itself. This observation phrases the Narasimhan–Seshadri theorem as a kind of infinite-dimensional version of the Kempf–Ness theorem from geometric invariant theory, relating critical points of the norm squared of the moment map (in this case Yang–Mills connections) to stable points on the corresponding algebraic quotient (in this case stable holomorphic vector bundles).  This idea has been subsequently very influential in gauge theory and complex geometry since its introduction.

Nahm equations

The Nahm equations, introduced by Werner Nahm, are obtained as the dimensional reduction of the anti-self-duality in four dimensions to one dimension, by imposing translational invariance in three directions. Concretely, one requires that the connection form  does not depend on the coordinates . In this setting the Nahm equations between a system of equations on an interval  for four matrices  satisfying the triple of equations

Nigel Hitchin showed that solutions to the Bogomolny equations could be used to construct solutions to the Nahm equations, showing solutions to the two problems were equivalent. Donaldson further showed that solutions to the Nahm equations are equivalent to rational maps of degree  from the complex projective line  to itself, where  is the charge of the corresponding magnetic monopole.

The moduli space of solutions to the Nahm equations has the structure of a hyperkähler manifold.

Hitchin's equations and Higgs bundles

Hitchin's equations, introduced by Nigel Hitchin, are obtained as the dimensional reduction of the self-duality equations in four dimensions to two dimensions by imposing translation invariance in two directions. Hitchin's equations state that for a pair  on a complex vector bundle  where , that

Solutions of Hitchin's equations are called Hitchin pairs.

Whereas solutions to the Yang–Mills equations on a compact Riemann surface correspond to projective unitary representations of the surface group, Hitchin showed that solutions to Hitchin's equations correspond to projective complex representations of the surface group. The moduli space of Hitchin pairs naturally has (when the rank and degree of the bundle are coprime) the structure of a Kähler manifold. This is shown through an infinite-dimensional moment map construction, and this moduli space of Higgs bundles also has a complex structure, which is different to that coming from the Hitchin pairs, leading to two complex structures on the moduli space  of Higgs bundles. These combine to give a third making this moduli space a hyperkähler manifold.

Hitchin's work was subsequently vastly generalised by Carlos Simpson, and the correspondence between solutions to Hitchin's equations and Higgs bundles over an arbitrary Kähler manifold is known as the nonabelian Hodge theorem.

Gauge theory in three dimensions

Monopoles

The dimensional reduction of the Yang–Mills equations to three dimensions by imposing translational invariance in one direction gives rise to the Bogomolny equations for a pair  where  is a family of matrices. The equations are

When the principal bundle  has structure group  the circle group, solutions to the Bogomolny equations model the Dirac monopole describing a magnetic monopole in classical electromagnetism. This charge is defined as the limit 

Chern–Simons theory

Chern–Simons theory in 3 dimensions is a topological quantum field theory with an action functional proportional to the integral of the Chern–Simons form, a three-form defined by

Classical solutions to the Euler–Lagrange equations of the Chern–Simons functional on a closed 3-manifold  correspond to flat connections on the principal -bundle . However, when  has a boundary the situation becomes more complicated. Chern–Simons theory was used by Edward Witten to express the Jones polynomial, a knot invariant, in terms of the vacuum expectation value of a Wilson loop in  Chern–Simons theory on the three-sphere . This was a stark demonstration of the power of gauge theoretic problems to provide new insight in topology, and was one of the first instances of a topological quantum field theory.

In the quantization of the classical Chern–Simons theory, one studies the induced flat or projectively flat connections on the principal bundle restricted to surfaces  inside the 3-manifold. The classical state spaces corresponding to each surface are precisely the moduli spaces of Yang–Mills equations studied by Atiyah and Bott. The geometric quantization of these spaces was achieved by Nigel Hitchin and Axelrod–Della Pietra–Witten independently, and in the case where the structure group is complex, the configuration space is the moduli space of Higgs bundles and its quantization was achieved by Witten.

Floer homology

Andreas Floer introduced a type of homology on a 3-manifolds defined in analogy with Morse homology in finite dimensions. In this homology theory, the Morse function is the Chern–Simons functional on the space of connections on an  principal bundle over the 3-manifold . The critical points are the flat connections, and the flow lines are defined to be the Yang–Mills instantons on  that restrict to the critical flat connections on the two boundary components. This leads to instanton Floer homology.

In analogy with instanton Floer homology one may define Seiberg–Witten Floer homology where instantons are replaced with solutions of the Seiberg–Witten equations. By work of Clifford Taubes this is known to be isomorphic to embedded contact homology and subsequently Heegaard Floer homology.

Gauge theory in four dimensions

Gauge theory has been most intensively studied in four dimensions. Here the mathematical study of gauge theory overlaps significantly with its physical origins, as the standard model of particle physics can be thought of as a quantum field theory on a four-dimensional spacetime. The study of gauge theory problems in four dimensions naturally leads to the study of topological quantum field theory. Such theories are physical gauge theories that are insensitive to changes in the Riemannian metric of the underlying four-manifold, and therefore can be used to define topological (or smooth structure) invariants of the manifold.

Anti-self-duality equations

In four dimensions the Yang–Mills equations admit a simplification to the first order anti-self-duality equations  for a connection  on a principal bundle  over an oriented Riemannian four-manifold . These solutions to the Yang–Mills equations represent the absolute minima of the Yang–Mills functional, and the higher critical points correspond to the solutions  that do not arise from anti-self-dual connections. The moduli space of solutions to the anti-self-duality equations, allows one to derive useful invariants about the underlying four-manifold. 

This theory is most effective in the case where  is simply connected. This implies that the intersection form of such a four-manifold is diagonalisable. There are examples of simply connected topological four-manifolds with non-diagonalisable intersection form, such as the E8 manifold, so Donaldson's theorem implies the existence of topological four-manifolds with no smooth structure. This is in stark contrast with two or three dimensions, in which topological structures and smooth structures are equivalent: any topological manifold of dimension less than or equal to 3 has a unique smooth structure on it.

Similar techniques were used by Clifford Taubes and Donaldson to show that Euclidean space  admits uncountably infinitely many distinct smooth structures. This is in stark contrast to any dimension other than four, where Euclidean space has a unique smooth structure.

An extension of these ideas leads to Donaldson theory, which constructs further invariants of smooth four-manifolds out of the moduli spaces of connections over them. These invariants are obtained by evaluating cohomology classes on the moduli space against a fundamental class, which exists due to analytical work showing the orientability and compactness of the moduli space by Karen Uhlenbeck, Taubes, and Donaldson.

When the four-manifold is a Kähler manifold or algebraic surface and the principal bundle has vanishing first Chern class, the anti-self-duality equations are equivalent to the Hermitian Yang–Mills equations on the complex manifold . The Kobayashi–Hitchin correspondence proven for algebraic surfaces by Donaldson, and in general by Uhlenbeck and Yau, asserts that solutions to the HYM equations correspond to stable holomorphic vector bundles. This work gave an alternate algebraic description of the moduli space and its compactification, because the moduli space of semistable holomorphic vector bundles over a complex manifold is a projective variety, and therefore compact. This indicates one way of compactifying the moduli space of connections is to add in connections corresponding to semi-stable vector bundles, so-called almost Hermitian Yang–Mills connections.

Seiberg–Witten equations

During their investigation of supersymmetry in four dimensions, Edward Witten and Nathan Seiberg uncovered a system of equations now called the Seiberg–Witten equations, for a connection  and spinor field . In this case the four-manifold must admit a SpinC structure, which defines a principal SpinC bundle  with determinant line bundle , and an associated spinor bundle . The Seiberg–Witten equations are given by

Solutions to the Seiberg–Witten equations are called monopoles. The moduli space of solutions to the Seiberg–Witten equations,  where  denotes the choice of Spin structure, is used to derive the Seiberg–Witten invariants. The Seiberg–Witten equations have an advantage over the anti-self-duality equations, in that the equations themselves may be perturbed slightly to give the moduli space of solutions better properties. To do this, an arbitrary self-dual two-form is added on to the first equation. For generic choices of metric  on the underlying four-manifold, and choice of perturbing two-form, the moduli space of solutions is a compact smooth manifold. In good circumstances (when the manifold  is of simple type), this moduli space is zero-dimensional: a finite collection of points. The Seiberg–Witten invariant in this case is simply the number of points in the moduli space. The Seiberg–Witten invariants can be used to prove many of the same results as Donaldson invariants, but often with easier proofs which apply in more generality.

Gauge theory in higher dimensions

Hermitian Yang–Mills equations

A particular class of Yang–Mills connections are possible to study over Kähler manifolds or Hermitian manifolds. The Hermitian Yang–Mills equations generalise the anti-self-duality equations occurring in four-dimensional Yang–Mills theory to holomorphic vector bundles over Hermitian complex manifolds in any dimension. The Hermitian Yang–Mills equations are

These may be viewed either as an equation for the Hermitian connection  or for the corresponding Hermitian metric  with associated Chern connection . In four dimensions the HYM equations are equivalent to the ASD equations. In two dimensions the HYM equations correspond to the Yang–Mills equations considered by Atiyah and Bott. The Kobayashi–Hitchin correspondence asserts that solutions of the HYM equations are in correspondence with polystable holomorphic vector bundles. In the case of compact Riemann surfaces this is the theorem of Narasimhan and Seshadri as proven by Donaldson. For algebraic surfaces it was proven by Donaldson, and in general it was proven by Karen Uhlenbeck and Shing-Tung Yau. This theorem is generalised in the nonabelian Hodge theorem by Simpson, and is in fact a special case of it where the Higgs field of a Higgs bundle  is set to zero.

Exceptional holonomy instantons

The effectiveness of solutions of the Yang–Mills equations in defining invariants of four-manifolds has led to interest that they may help distinguish between exceptional holonomy manifolds such as G2 manifolds in dimension 7 and Spin(7) manifolds in dimension 8, as well as related structures such as Calabi–Yau 6-manifolds and nearly Kähler manifolds.

String theory

New gauge-theoretic problems arise out of superstring theory models. In such models the universe is 10 dimensional consisting of four dimensions of regular spacetime and a 6-dimensional Calabi–Yau manifold. In such theories the fields which act on strings live on bundles over these higher dimensional spaces, and one is interested in gauge-theoretic problems relating to them. For example, the limit of the natural field theories in superstring theory as the string radius approaches zero (the so-called large volume limit) on a Calabi–Yau 6-fold is given by Hermitian Yang–Mills equations on this manifold. Moving away from the large volume limit one obtains the deformed Hermitian Yang–Mills equation, which describes the equations of motion for a D-brane in the B-model of superstring theory. Mirror symmetry predicts that solutions to these equations should correspond to special Lagrangian submanifolds of the mirror dual Calabi–Yau.

See also

Gauge theory
Introduction to gauge theory
Gauge group (mathematics)
Gauge symmetry (mathematics)
Yang–Mills theory
Yang–Mills equations

References

Differential geometry
Mathematical physics